The 2014–15 season is Real Betis' hundredth sixth season of existence, and the club will play in Segunda División after enjoying a three-year spell in the Spanish top flight.

Current squad

Youth players

Out on loan

Retired numbers

26  Miki Roqué (deceased) (2009–12)

Competitions

Liga Adelante

League table

Results by round

Matches

Copa del Rey

Second round

Third round

Round of 32

References

Real Betis seasons
Betis